Brian Stonehill (December 20, 1953August 6, 1997) was an American media studies scholar. He was a professor of English at Pomona College in Claremont, California, where he founded the college's media studies department. He was the author of the book The Self-Conscious Novel: Artifice in Fiction from Joyce to Pynchon.

References

External links
Brian Stonehill Papers at The Claremont Colleges Library

1953 births
1997 deaths
Pomona College faculty
Media studies writers
American mass media scholars
Road incident deaths in California
Haverford College alumni
University of Chicago alumni